Simo Aalto (born 19 March 1960) is a magician who became popular in Finland in the 1980s. He established Joker Poker Box, which is labeled an artist-festival tour he owns with his wife Kirsti. Aalto is known for a wide range of skills from fingertip system to illusions. He also specializes in abdominal distension, imitation, and a number tricks.

Simo Aalto's daughter is Sari Aalto and his brother's children are singers Suvi Aalto and Saara Aalto.

References

Finnish Magic Circle's list of awards (Finnish)
Finnish Performing Artist Association's list of awards (Finnish)
FISM's official list of champions
Aalto's Curriculum Vitae

External links
Aalto's website
Simo's Magic Tent in YLE archives (Finnish)

1960 births
Living people
People from Oulu
Finnish magicians